A tablature editor is a piece of software that aids in creating tablature such as guitar tablature. Most tablature editors have features like playback and MIDI file import.

See also
 List of music software
 List of guitar tablature software.

Music software